Sankt Ingbert station is a railway station in St. Ingbert, in the federal state of Saarland in Germany. The station was opened in 1867, with the concourse in its current form opening in 1879. It is located on the edge of the town centre, one stop away from the central bus station. The station is ranked as a class 3 station and is served by several Regional-Express and Regionalbahn services operated by Deutsche Bahn.

History

Initial operations

According to historical documents the first station building was built in 1867, during the construction of the Palatine Ludwig Railway between Homburg and St. Ingbert. For several years the station remained a terminus, and it was not until the 1870s when a line to Saarbrücken was constructed. Because of an increase in passengers a new station building was also necessary. The building which is still in use today is situated on the south side of the platforms opposite its predecessor.

Interregio services
From the early 1970s the station was a stop for Interregio fast trains operating to destinations as far as Berlin and Paris as well as semi-fast and stopping regional services. However, after a timetable change in 1991 and the introduction of an Interregio service between Stuttgart and Frankfurt-am-Main the services were cancelled completely.

Architecture
St. Ingbert station is a typical example of the style used in Saarland stations at the time. The most prominent aspect of this can be found in the arched windows on the ground floor and the rectangular ones on the first floor. Additionally, the sobriety of the design and the lack of vertical structure are typical. However, the single entrance through an avant-corps is unusual.

Current operations

All of the trains operating on the Palatine Ludwig Railway and the Landau–Rohrbach railway stop at the station. There are half-hourly services in the direction of Homburg, with hourly extensions to Kaiserslautern. In the other direction all services travel to Saarbrücken with extensions to Trier. On the Landau–Rohrbach railway, services travel to Pirmasens, with morning extensions to Landau via the Saar Railway.

References

Railway stations in the Saarland
Sankt Ingbert
Railway stations in Germany opened in 1867
Buildings and structures in Saarpfalz-Kreis